Ździary  is a village in the administrative district of Gmina Jarocin, within Nisko County, Subcarpathian Voivodeship, in south-eastern Poland.

The village has a population of 510.

LZS Ździary 
The village is a home for the LZS Ździary football team. As of the 2021–22 season, they compete in the regional league. In 2021, they reached the Subcarpathian-Stalowa Wola Polish Cup final.

References

Villages in Nisko County